is a German male classical vocal ensemble based in Munich, founded in 1980 by six students of the , after the model of the Comedian Harmonists. They sing a broad repertory, from Gregorian chant to contemporary music, including Volkslieder, Christmas carols, pop music and other crossover projects. Composers such as Enjott Schneider, Max Beckschäfer and Wilfried Hiller wrote music for them. Their name alludes to "", inserting "sing" into a typical German name for a symphony orchestra.

Performances 

Die Singphoniker appeared in 1995 at the Rheingau Musik Festival, singing Gregorian chant to a recitation by Gert Westphal in Eberbach Abbey. In 1999 they made their debut in New York at the Frick Collection, performing works by Schumann, Schubert and Mendelssohn as well as the Berliner Requiem by Kurt Weill on texts by Bertolt Brecht and songs of the Comedian Harmonists.

Recordings 

The ensemble recorded Edvard Grieg's part songs for male voices in 2002. A review observed that they "define ensemble unity as well as interpretive acuity" and mentioned their "impeccable vocalism and outstanding ensemble singing".

They recorded Franz Schubert's 95 complete part songs for male voices, which were intended to be sung by soloists, because the Congress of Vienna restricted all-male groups, even male choruses. A review of the recording noted that the singers "have been together almost twenty years and the members' voices have the rich sound and perfect blend of a string ensemble".

They recorded Singphonic Christmas, European Christmas carols, combined with harp music by Wilfred Hiller and Benjamin Britten, in settings by Nélida Béjar and Max Beckschäfer, among others. A reviewer praised their "singing, so perfectly balanced, the voices ideally matched, the expression so vibrant and compelling." In 2013 they recorded secular songs by Josef Rheinberger, several of them as first recordings.

Most of their albums have been published by the label Classic Produktion Osnabrück (cpo), except some by Oehms Classics, both independent German classic music labels.

Music composed for Die Singphoniker

Enjott Schneider composed for the ensemble , premiered in 1984. In 2005 they sang the premiere of Wilfred Hiller's church opera Augustinus. Max Beckschäfer composed for them in 1992 "" for 6 voices, in 2000 "Shakespeare Songs" (7 songs from plays by Shakespeare) for 4 male voices and piano, and in 2007 both "", a madrigal after a poem by Clément Marot, and arrangements of four European Christmas carols.

Singers 

The ensemble typically performs as a sextet. The current singers are:

 Johannes Euler, counter-tenor
 Daniel Schreiber, tenor
 Henning Jensen, tenor
 Berno Scharpf, baritone (and piano)
 Michael Mantaj, bass-baritone
 Christian Schmidt, bass

Former members are:

 Markus Geitner, counter-tenor
 Alfons Brandl, tenor
 Christoph Rösel, tenor
 Bernhard Hofmann (de), tenor
 , tenor
 Manuel Warwitz, tenor
 Ludwig Thomas, baritone
 Gunnar Mühling, bass-baritone
 Franz-Xaver Lechner, bass (and piano)

Prizes and awards 

 1987:  (Record of the month) of the magazine Stereoplay for "Concert Collection"
 1991: First prize of the competition in Gorizia in the category vocal ensembles
 1994:  for the CD "Singphonic Mendelssohn"
 1997:  by Radio France for the complete vocal music by Franz Schubert
 1998:

References

External links 
 
 
 Die Singphoniker Alfons Brandl

Vocal ensembles
A cappella musical groups
Musical groups established in 1980
Oehms Classics artists